Harry Bellaver (born Enricho Bellaver; February 12, 1905 – August 8, 1993) was an American stage, film and television actor who appeared in many roles from the 1930s through the 1980s.

Early years
Bellaver was born in Hillsboro, Illinois, the son of Matteo and Maria (née Copa) Bellaver. His father worked in the Hillsboro coal mines. He left school at a young age and worked various jobs but eventually was awarded a scholarship to Brookwood Labor College in Katonah, New York.

Stage
Bellaver was a member of the Hedgerow Players of Rose Valley, Pennsylvania, for eight years. Early in Bellaver's career he appeared in numerous Broadway plays. He made his Broadway debut in the 1931 Group Theatre in the play 1931. He also appeared in the Elmer Rice play We, the People in 1933, and in the Broadway debut that year of The Threepenny Opera.

Bellaver appeared in the original production of the Broadway musical Annie Get Your Gun, as Chief Sitting Bull. He appeared in the same role in the 1966 revival.

Film

Bellaver was a prolific film character actor, mainly in "working class" roles, from 1939 through the 1960s. He appeared in the film adaptation of From Here to Eternity and in several notable film noirs. He played the role of ex-convict "Creeps" in 1939's Another Thin Man with William Powell and Myrna Loy.  He appeared in The House on 92nd Street (1945) as a taxi driver spying for the Nazis, and again played a cab driver, this time victimized by a gangster, in Side Street (1950). He played Sam the Surgeon in the classic Bob Hope comedy The Lemon Drop Kid (1951). 

He appeared in Love Me or Leave Me with James Cagney and Doris Day in 1955 and The Old Man and the Sea with Spencer Tracy in 1958. His other film roles included appearances in One Potato, Two Potato (1964), A Fine Madness (1966), Madigan (1968), The Hot Rock (1972), God Told Me To (1976), Blue Collar (1978), and the comedy Hero at Large (1980), starring John Ritter and Anne Archer. His last film role was as an old miner in the horror film The Stuff (1985).

Television
Bellaver is probably best known for his featured role as Sgt. Frank Arcaro in the television series Naked City appearing in 136 of the series' combined 138 episodes. He played an older, mellow detective who was a counterpoint to the dedicated young detectives played by James Franciscus and Paul Burke. He also was on Another World as Ernie Downs.

Military service
Bellaver served in the Special Services Unit of the U.S. Army during World War II, where he toured the front lines as a stage manager and actor in the U.S.O. Camp Show Over 21 which starred Vivian Vance and Philip Ober.

Personal life
Bellaver married Gertrude Dudley Vaughan Smith, "Dudley". They had two daughters, Vaughan and Lee.

Bellaver lived in Tappan, New York when he died of pneumonia on August 8, 1993 at Nyack Hospital in Nyack, New York. He was survived by his daughters Lee Bellaver of Stone Ridge, New York and theatrical casting director Vaughn Bellaver-Allentuck of East Hampton, Long Island, two grandsons, a granddaughter, and two great-granddaughters.

Broadway roles
 Night Over Taos (1932) - Diego
 Merry-Go-Round (1932) - Butch and as Beachley
 We, the People (1933) - Mike Ramsay
 She Loves Me Not (1933) - Mugg Schnitzel
 Russet Mantle (1936) - Pablo
 The World's Full of Girls (1943) -  Sergeant Snyder
 Annie Get Your Gun (1946) - Chief Sitting Bull
 That Championship Season--1973--Booth Theatre;New York City

Film roles

Another Thin Man (1939) - 'Creeps' Binder
The House on 92nd Street (1945) - Max Coburg
Kiss of Death (1947) - Bull Weed (uncredited)
Perfect Strangers (1950) - Gabor Simkiewicz, Bailiff
Side Street (1950) - Larry Giff
No Way Out (1950) - George Biddle
Stage to Tucson (1950) - Gus Heyden
The Lemon Drop Kid (1951) - Sam the Surgeon
The Tanks Are Coming (1951) - Sgt. Lemchek
Something to Live For (1952) - Billy, Elevator Operator
From Here to Eternity (1953) - Pvt. Mazzioli
Miss Sadie Thompson (1953) - Joe Horn
The Great Diamond Robbery (1954) - Herb
Love Me or Leave Me (1955) - Georgie
Serenade (1956) - Tonio
The Birds and the Bees (1956) - Marty Kennedy
The Brothers Rico (1957) - Mike Lamotta
Slaughter on Tenth Avenue (1957) - Benjy Karp
The Old Man and the Sea (1958) - Martin
One Potato, Two Potato (1964) - Judge Powell
A Fine Madness (1966) - Knocker
Madigan (1968) - Mickey Dunn
The Hot Rock (1972) - Rollo the Bartender
God Told Me To (1976) - Cookie
Blue Collar (1978) - Eddie Johnson
Hero at Large (1980) - Eddie
The Stuff (1985) - Old Miner (final film role)

References

External links

 Historical Society of Montgomery County Illinois

American male film actors
American male stage actors
American male television actors
Deaths from pneumonia in New York (state)
1905 births
1993 deaths
20th-century American male actors
People from Tappan, New York
People from Hillsboro, Illinois
Brookwood Labor College alumni
United States Army personnel of World War II